is a Japanese manga artist born in Hokkaido, Japan. She is best known for her manga series The Ancient Magus' Bride, which was adapted into an anime television series in 2017.

Works
  (2012–2013)
  (2013–present)
  (2014–2017)
  (2021–present)

See also

References

External links
 Official blog 
  
 

Female comics writers
Japanese female comics artists
Japanese women writers
Living people
Manga artists from Hokkaido
Women manga artists
Year of birth missing (living people)